The A-Bolt Rifle is a bolt-action rifle designed by the American Browning Arms Company. It is manufactured by Miroku Corp in Japan. The A-Bolt replaced the Browning BBR in 1984. It is a popular hunting rifle due to its accuracy and availability.

Description 
The A-Bolt rifle is a bolt-action rifle with a short-lift bolt angle of 60 degrees. It uses a non-rotating bolt sleeve (partial sleeve on first generation A-bolt rifles). When the bolt is unlocked, smoothness is achieved with three guide ribs aligned with three locking lugs, enabling precise movement (only on the second and third generation A-bolt rifles). These three locking lugs also greatly increase bolt strength. The bolt's smoothness is also increased with a unique cartridge depressor; the cartridge depressor stays in place independent of the bolt's position. Near the end of the reloading cycle, when the bolt is re-inserted, the bolt moves gently over the cartridges in the magazine. The safety-catch is two-position, and is functioned using a thumb-slide on the action top-strap in the same manner as a shotgun. The barrel is free-floating and the recoil lug is glass bedded.

The A-Bolt rifle uses a detachable box magazine. Magazine capacity depends on caliber.
Each A-bolt model chambers different calibres, with the Composite Stalker available for 18 calibres in the North America market alone. The available calibre also depends on the country where the rifle is distributed. See the Browning website in the country of choice for the list of available calibres according to the A-Bolt model.

Variations 

The A-Bolt rifle has many variations, yet most are small differences such as different barrel lengths and caliber.
 Composite Stalker Rifles
 Hunter Rifles
 Medallion Rifles
 Mountain Rifles
 Stainless M-1000 Eclipse Rifles
 Varmint Stalker Rifles
 White Gold Rifles
 Eclipse Hunter Rifles
 M-1000 Eclipse Rifles
 Micro Hunter Rifles
 NRA Wildlife Conservation Collection Rifles
 Stainless Stalker Rifles
 White Gold Medallion Rifles
 Long Range Hunter Rifles
 TCT Varmint Rifles
 Target Rifles

See also
 List of firearms
 List of rifle cartridges

References

External links 
 The official Browning Arms Company website
 A-Bolt rifle page from the Official Browning arms website

Bolt-action rifles